State Route 381 (SR 381) is a state highway in Johnson City, Washington County, Tennessee. It serves as a bypass of Downtown on the north, west and south sides of the city. The route is also a retail corridor, lined with stores, restaurants and hotels.

Route description
SR 381 begins on the south side of Johnson City at an intersection with US 321 and SR 67. US 321 and SR 381 run concurrently for 2.8 miles north, they then turn west and back north again, to a junction with US 11E where US 321 heads west along US 11E and SR 381 continues north through a retail area. SR 381 junctions with I-26 and US 23 exit 19 the route then has an interchange with SR 36 and SR 381 ends at an interchange with US 11E and US 19W on the north side of Johnson City.

Junction list

References

External links

381
Transportation in Washington County, Tennessee